La Chapelle-Villars is a commune in the Loire department in central France. It is part of the Parc naturel régional du Pilat. It is also home to the mountain, Mont Ministre.

Population

See also
Communes of the Loire department

References

Communes of Loire (department)